Xaltocan was a pre-Columbian city-state and island in the Valley of Mexico, located in the center of Lake Xaltocan, part of an interconnected shallow lake system which included Lake Texcoco; this place is now inside the village of San Miguel Jaltocan in Nextlalpan, State of Mexico. The site was originally settled by the Otomi people but following a war in the late fourteenth century where the Otomi were defeated by an alliance of Tepanecs and Mexica the Otomi were driven off the island and relocated to Otumba, Metztitlan and Tlaxcala. The island of Xaltocan was then resettled by Nahuatl speakers. The name can mean either of two things in the Nahuatl language: either 'sandy ground of spiders' or 'where it is planted on the sand'.

Overview

Xaltocan is known to have been inhabited in the Postclassic period. Ceramics and other archaeological remains dating to this period have been recovered in excavations at the site. It is thought to have been a local center of power capable of exacting tribute from other city-states in the area.

The founding of Xaltocan is described in the mytho-historical documents, the Historia Tolteca-Chichimeca and Anales de Cuauhtitlan. According to the Anales the Xaltocameca (people of Xaltocan) were among the Chichimec tribes that left the mythical place of origin, Aztlán, under a leader named Quauhtliztac ("White Eagle"). The Historia also identifies the Xaltocameca as belong to the Otomi ethnic group. In this document, written by Ixtlilxochitl, the first leader of the Xaltocameca is named Iztacquauhtli, which also means "White Eagle" in Nahuatl.

Xaltocan's island location gave it certain advantages that other areas would not have had access to, such as making it easier to fortify, however one particularly noteworthy use of Xaltocan's location was to use the lake to create chinampas which played a vital role in the agriculture of Xaltocan. The chinampas would have been used to grow a variety of foods including corn, beans, squash and much more. It's been found that there was a calculable agricultural surplus in Xaltocan.

In the 13th century Xaltocan were involved in a prolonged war with the Nahua city-state of Cuauhtitlan. Xaltocan was initially the strongest but around 1395 the ruler of Cuauhtitlan, Xaltemoctzin, allied himself with Tezozomoc of Azcapotzalco and his subjects the Mexica of Tenochtitlan and finally managed to conquer Xaltocan. The Otomi inhabitants fled north to the Otomian city-state of Metztitlan and to Tlaxcala, while others were allowed to resettle on the lands of Texcoco in the place that was henceforth called Otumba - "Place of the Otomies".

During the next 100 years the site was resettled by Nahua peoples. After the Aztec Triple Alliance defeated the Tepanecs of Azcapotzalco, Xaltocan became an Aztec subject city and paid tribute to Tenochtitlan, mainly in the form of woven blankets. The Aztec resettlement of Xaltocan also caused a breakdown in several of the key institutions that were required to keep the farming in Xaltocan sustainable, this caused the chinampas to eventually be abandoned.

In 1521, during the Spanish conquest of the Aztec Empire, the army of Hernán Cortés razed Xaltocan and burned it to the ground.

Notes

References
 Brumfiel, E.M. & M.G. Hodge, 1996, Interaction in the basin of Mexico: The case of Postclassic Xaltocan- Arqueología mesoamericana: homenaje a William T. Sanders
 Brumfiel, Elizabeth M., Ed. 2005, "Production and Power at Postclassic Xaltocan" Arqueología de México, No. 6, published by University of Pittsburgh Latin American Archaeology Publications and Instituto Nacional de Antropología e Historia (México, D.F.)389 pp. .
 Brumfiel, Elizabeth M., 1996, "The Quality of Tribute Cloth: The Place of Evidence in Archaeological Argument" in  American Antiquity, Vol. 61
 Davies, Nigel, 1980, The Toltec Heritage - from the fall of Tula to the rise of Tenochtitlan, University of Oklahoma Press.
 De Lucia, Kristin. “Household Lake Exploitation and Aquatic Lifeways in Postclassic Xaltocan, Mexico.” Journal of Anthropological Archaeology, vol. 62, 2021, https://doi.org/10.1016/j.jaa.2021.101273.
 Hodge, Mary G., and Hector Neff 2005 Xaltocan in the Economy of the Basin of Mexico: A View from Ceramic Tradewares. In Production and Power at Postclassic Xaltocan. Elizabeth M. Brumfiel, ed. Pp. 319–348. Mexico City : Instituto Nacional de Antropología e Historia.
 Morehart, C. T. (2012), What If the Aztec Empire Never Existed? The Prerequisites of Empire and the Politics of Plausible Alternative Histories. American Anthropologist, 114: 267–281. 
 Morehart, Christopher T, and Destiny L Crider. “Low-Intensity Investigations at Three Small Sites along Lake Xaltocan in the Northern Basin of Mexico.” Latin American Antiquity, vol. 27, no. 2, 2016, pp. 257–263.
 Morehart, Christopher T. “Chinampa Agriculture, Surplus Production, and Political Change at Xaltocan, Mexico.” Ancient Mesoamerica, vol. 27, no. 1, 2016, pp. 183–196., https://doi.org/10.1017/S0956536116000109.
Morehart, Christopher T. and Dan T.A. Eisenberg 2010 Prosperity, Power, and Change: Modeling Maize at Postclassic Xaltocan, Mexico. Journal of Anthropological Archaeology 29(1):94–112.
Rodríguez-Alegría Enrique, et al. “Trade, Tribute, and Neutron Activation: The Colonial Political Economy of Xaltocan, Mexico.” Journal of Anthropological Archaeology, vol. 32, no. 4, 2013, pp. 397–414., https://doi.org/10.1016/j.jaa.2013.07.001.
Romero Navarrete Omar 2007 La gloria de Xaltocan: los guerreros del sol. Mexico, D.F. : Talleres de Luis Gonzalez Obregon

Archaeological sites in Mexico
Mesoamerican sites
Aztec sites
Former populated places in Mexico
Otomi sites
Lake islands of Mexico
Altepetl
Nextlalpan